is an original net animation written and directed by Romanov Higa. The story takes place circa 1943, during World War II.

Story
Facing a losing war, the Nazi Party discovers a marooned spaceship capable of time travel, thus enabling them to alter the outcome of their fate. Enter Erna Kurtz, a newly hired spy who stumbles upon the Nazis' plot. With the help of her fearless friend Janet, Erna must face her past in order to secure her future.

See also
Nazi UFOs

External links

2003 anime ONAs
2003 anime OVAs
Action anime and manga
Science fiction anime and manga
Works about Nazi Germany